Loy is both a given name and a surname.

Loy may also refer to:

 Loy (gastropod), a genus of sea slugs within the superfamily Onchidoridoidea
 Loy, County Tyrone, a townland in County Tyrone, Northern Ireland
 Loy's Ape, an unconfirmed species of primate formally known as ameranthropoides loysi
 USS Loy (DE-160), a destroyer escort of the United States Navy
 Loy (spade), a type of spade once used for manual ploughing in Ireland

See also
 St Loy's Cove, a small bay in Cornwall, UK